Deep Ocean mission (informally known as Samudrayaan program, meaning "Sea Craft" in Sanskrit) is an Indian initiative to undertake the deep ocean exploration focused on India's exclusive economic zones and continental shelf. The program will consist of various crewed and uncrewed submersibles exploring the sea bed. One of the primary aims of the mission is to explore and extract polymetallic nodules, which are composed of minerals like manganese, nickel, cobalt, copper and iron hydroxide. The metals can used in the manufacturing of electronic devices, smartphones, batteries and solar panels.

India has been allocated a  site in the Central Indian Ocean Basin by the International Seabed Authority for the purposes of exploring for and extracting polymetallic nodules on the seabed. The estimated amount of polymetallic nodules in the given area is about 380 million tonnes, containing 4.7 million tonnes of nickel, 4.29 million tonnes of copper and 0.55 million tonnes of cobalt and 92.59 million tonnes of manganese. The approximate cost of the programme will be Rs. 4077 crore for a of 5 year period and this will be implemented in a phase-wise process. The first phase of the project is from 2021 to 2024.

History
The study of the ocean in India began when the Government sponsored the program on polymetallic nodules (PMN) initiated at CSIR-NIO with the collection of the first nodule sample from Arabian sea on board the first research vessel Gaveshani on 26 January 1981.

The International Seabed Authority (ISA), an autonomous international organisation established under the 1982 United Nations Convention on the Law of the Sea, allotted the ‘area’ for deep-sea mining. India was the first country to receive the status of a 'Pioneer Investor' in 1987 and was given an area of about 1.5 lakh sq km in the Central Indian Ocean Basin (CIOB) for nodule exploration.

India was the first country in the world, to have sponsored the exploration of deep sea mineral viz polymetallic nodules, in the central Indian Ocean basin in 1987.

In 2002, India signed a contract with the ISA and after complete resource analysis of the seabed 50% was surrendered and the country retained an area of 75,000 sq km.

Further studies have helped narrow the mining area to 18,000 sq km which will be the ‘First Generation Mine-site’.

Background
India has an Exclusive Economic zone allocated  which is unexplored and unutilised.

Exclusive Economic zones are boundaries prescribed by the United nations Convention on the law of the sea which give the rights to a state regarding the exploration and use of marine resources.

It has been estimated that 380 million metric tonnes of PMN are available at the bottom of the seas in the central Indian Ocean.

It is estimated that 10% of recovery of that can meet India's energy requirement for next 100 years.

Goal and objectives
The centre has drawn up a five-year plan, with a cost of ₹8000 crore, to mine, research and study about the ocean floor.

The objectives of the plan include research work that can result in formation of a roadmap on climate change and help in developing a desalination plant powered by tidal energy.

One of the key projects which can enable the above said research is the creation of a submersible vehicle that can explore depths of at least .

Progress made
Indian Space Research Organisation developed the design of a crewed submersible capsule capable of travelling 6,000 m deep for the mission. The development was announced on the sidelines of the silver jubilee celebrations of the National Institute of Ocean Technology. A deep-submergence vehicle named Matsya 6000 is under development. The first uncrewed trial of the vehicle was conducted on 27 October 2021 where the 'personnel sphere' was lowered up to a depth of 600 m, off the coast of Chennai. The trial was successful and received the certification for further development. Following the success of the trial, the "Samudrayaan" program was formally launched on 29 October 2021.

See also
National Institute of Ocean Technology
Indian Space Research Organisation
Matsya 6000

References

Jacob Koshy (29 July 2018)govt-plans-isro-like-ocean-mission The Hindu
http://pib.nic.in/newsite/PrintRelease.aspx?relid=163263
4 June 2019 earth-sciences-ministry-to-formulate-deep-ocean-mission new United India news

2018 establishments in India
Cobalt minerals
Copper minerals
Government of India
Manganese minerals
Nickel minerals
Ocean exploration
Underwater mining